Missulena granulosa is a species of mygalomorph spiders in the family Actinopodidae. It is found in Western Australia.

References

granulosa
Spiders described in 1869